The 2023 People's Choice Country Awards, the innagural ceremony, is set to be held in September 2023 at the Grand Ole Opry in Nashville, Tennessee. The ceremony will be broadcast live on NBC and will be available to stream on Peacock.

Background 
On March 9, 2023, NBCUniversal announced that they would be premiering an offshoot of the long-running People’s Choice Awards, honoring country music's most popular artists, with the winners will be chosen entirely by the fans, though several honorary awards will also be bestowed.

References 

Country music awards
People's Choice Awards
21st century in Nashville, Tennessee
2023 music awards
2023 awards in the United States
2023 in Tennessee
September 2023 events in North America